Latario Rachal (born January 31, 1973) is a retired professional football player in the National Football League. He played two years for the San Diego Chargers, primarily as a special teams punt returner and a wide receiver. In 1998, he finished 2nd in the AFC, with 387 yards on 32 returns. He did not return after 1998 to the Chargers.

He previously coached football and track at Chadwick School in Palos Verdes, California and is a wide receivers coach at his brother's 'Pride N Skills Academy' in Palos Verdes, California.

He is currently the wide receivers coach at Orange Lutheran High School.  Rachal also trains several collegiate and high school athletes in Carson, California.

References 

 "Latario Rachal", National Football League website.
 "Receiver Rachal Is Discovering That Success Comes by Degrees", Rob Fernas, July 29, 1993.
 "Latario Rachal - Wide Receivers Coach", Pride N Skills Academy.

External links 
 El Camino College bio

1974 births
Living people
American football return specialists
American football wide receivers
Amsterdam Admirals players
Fresno State Bulldogs football players
Los Angeles Xtreme players
San Diego Chargers players